Daning River, is a river in the Chinese province of Guangxi.

References

Rivers of Guangxi